The 2014–15 season was East Bengal's 8th season in the I-League and 95th season in existence.

Competitions

Overall

Overview

Calcutta Football League

Table

Fixtures & results

I-League

Table

Fixtures & results

Federation Cup

Group A

Fixtures & results

AFC Cup

Group F

Fixtures & results

Statistics

Appearances 
Players with no appearances are not included in the list.

Goal scorers

References

East
East Bengal Club seasons